Acraea alticola, the Schultze's acraea, is a butterfly in the family Nymphalidae. It is found in Nigeria and Cameroon. The habitat consists of sub-montane forests. See Pierre & Bernaud, 2014 for taxonomy

References

Butterflies described in 1923
alticola